KZXR (1310 AM) is a radio station that is currently silent, but which formerly broadcast a Regional Mexican format. Licensed to Prosser, Washington, United States, the station is currently owned by Iglesia Pentecostal Vispera del Fin.

Previous owner Bustos Media took KZXR silent on April 30, 2020, due to economic circumstances related to the coronavirus pandemic.

History
http://www.angelfire.com/wa/kzxr/source.html The Source 1310AM

References

External links

ZXR (AM)